The 2017 mayoral election in Lancaster, Pennsylvania, was held on November 7, 2017, and resulted in the election of Democratic Party nominee Danene Sorace to her first term as mayor.

Background
Three-term incumbent mayor Rick Gray, a Democrat, did not seek re-election.

Campaign
The general election was contested by five candidates: Democratic nominee Danene Sorace, a member of the Lancaster City Council; Republican Party nominee Cindy Stewart, a retired nonprofit executive; and independent candidates John "Woody" Chandler, a former U.S. Navy sailor and teacher; Tony Dastra, a coffee shop shift manager and open government activist; and Zac Nesbitt, a restaurant server and co-chair of Lancaster Pride Fest. Norman Bristol Colon, a political consultant and activist; and Kevin Ressler, a community organizer and advocate, also sought the Democratic nomination. Stewart was unopposed for the Republican nomination.

Results

See also
 2017 United States elections
 List of mayors of Lancaster, Pennsylvania

References

2017
Lancaster
Lancaster Mayor
Election Mayor 2017